Antão or Antao is a Portuguese given name that's equivalent to Anthony or Antonio in use in Portugal, Brazil, South Africa, Namibia, Angola and Mozambique and a surname. Notable people with this name include the following:

Given name
 Antao D'Souza (born 17 January 1939), Goan cricketer
 Antão de Almada, 7th Count of Avranches (c. 1573 – 1644), Portuguese national hero
 Antão de Almada, 12th Count of Avranches (1718 – 1797), Portugues political administrator
 Antão Gonçalves (15th-century), Portuguese explorer
 Antão Martins Homem (1450s–1531), Portuguese nobleman

Surname
 John da Silva Antao (born 1933), Portuguese priest
 Walfrido Antão (fl. 1950s-1980s), Goan writer

See also

Abtao (disambiguation)
ANAO (disambiguation)
Anta (disambiguation)
Antah, city in India
Antal (surname)
Antar (disambiguation)
Anto (name)

References

Portuguese masculine given names